(Parliamentary) Committee on Social Insurance (SfU) is a parliamentary committee in the Swedish Riksdag. The committee's areas of responsibility concern health insurance, pensions, policies on families, asylum, human migration, integration policies for newly arrived migrants, along with Swedish citizenship.

The Speaker of the committee is "to be elected" from the Moderate Party and the vice-Speaker is Ida Gabrielsson from the Left Party.

List of speakers for the committee

List of vice-speakers for the committee

References

External links
 Riksdag - Socialförsäkringsutskottet (Social Insurance Committee)

Committees of the Riksdag